Ismail El Shafei (born 15 November 1947) is an Egyptian former professional tennis player and president of the Egyptian Tennis Federation. He is currently a member of the board of directors of the International Tennis Federation and is chairman of the ITF Junior Circuit. He won six career singles titles and reached eleven finals. In doubles, he won nine career titles.

Career
El Shafei played his first tournament in March 1962 at the Egyptian Championships losing in straight sets to Italian player Giuseppe Merlo in the round of 32. He reached his first tournament final in Ostordorf, West Germany in 1963 before losing to Harald Elschenbroich. In 1964, he won the boys' singles tournament at Wimbledon. He won his first senior's tournament in San Jose, Costa Rica in January 1966. He won the Egyptian Open in Cairo three times (1969, 1974–1974). An adaptable player, he competed on all surfaces, (grass, clay, hardcourt, and carpet). El Shafei is the only Egyptian player to make the top 40 in Grand Prix/ATP ranking history. He is one of only four players to beat Björn Borg at Wimbledon, knocking him out in the third round in 1974 (the other three were John McEnroe, Roger Taylor and Arthur Ashe.) He reached his last professional singles final (exhibition) at the Cairo Invitational losing to Bjorn Borg in two sets in December 1979 and played his last singles tournament in June 1982 at the Bristol Open losing to then South African player Johan Kriek, he retired in 1983.

Post playing career
Following his playing career El Shafei remained involved in tennis in an administrative role: he was elected president of the Egyptian Tennis Federation on two occasions (1994–96 and 2005–08). In 1998, he was elected to the board of directors of the International Tennis Federation until 2001. He would serve a second term as director of the ITF (2003–2013). In September 2015, he was elected for a third term as a director and is currently chairman of coaching and chairman of the juniors circuit.

Personal
He was educated at Cairo University and is the son of Adli El Shafei and father of Adli El Shafei II.

Career finals

Singles: 17 (6 titles, 11 runner-ups)

Doubles (9 titles, 18 runner-ups)

Grand Slam singles performance timeline
Won Wimbledon Championship for Boys 1964 & was runner-up in 1963

Davis Cup
El Shafei participated in 17 ties for Egypt, where he played 42 matches, winning 23, losing 19 he also served as team captain in the 1980s.

References

External links
 
 

1947 births
Living people
Egyptian male tennis players
Sportspeople from Cairo
Wimbledon junior champions
Mediterranean Games silver medalists for Egypt
Mediterranean Games medalists in tennis
Competitors at the 1963 Mediterranean Games
Grand Slam (tennis) champions in boys' singles
African Games medalists in tennis
African Games bronze medalists for Egypt
Competitors at the 1965 All-Africa Games
20th-century Egyptian people
21st-century Egyptian people